The Gawaria are a Hindu caste found in North India.  They are also known as Banjara  and Kalenra. They live in the Indian state of Rajasthan, including the districts of Nagaur, Jodhpur, Jaipur, Ajmer, Barmer, Jaisalmer, and Alwar.Banswara, Udaipur

Structure 
Gawaria is a sub-group within the larger Banjara community. 

The Gawaria are divided into three sub-groups, Rajput Gawaria, Dharampur Gawaria, and Gwar Gawaria. The Rajput and Gwar groups are considered superior. These two sub-groups are endogamous. 

The Gawaria are further divided into clans, known as gotras. Each gotra claims descent from a common ancestor and marriages between other member's clans are strictly forbidden.

History 
According to their traditions, the community descends from three brothers - Tapasvi Singh, Lakhi Singh, and Bhumi Singh. These brothers lost their land and took to peddling goods and services. The Gawaria was a nomadic community traveling throughout North India selling their wares. However, the emergence of railways in the 19th century forced the community to abandon their traditional occupation. 

The community is now settled on the outskirts of villages and towns involved in trading and business. They are distributed across North India, in particular in Haryana, Rajasthan, Punjab and, Uttar Pradesh. They speak the Marwari language, although most also understand Hindi.

Culture 

The Gawaria are now a denotified Ghumantu community, The community's distinct dialect distinguishes it from neighbouring communities. They tend to be residentially segregated. They are entirely Hindu, and worship local deities such as the Gurgaon wali mata. Their education status is very poor.

Economy 
Many in the rural areas are agricultural labourers while those in the cities are wage labourers. A few have taken to trade or education. Women sell beauty items. Gawaria people work munj, ban, sirki, kunchi, and chapper.

See also 
 Gadhia community

References 

Social groups of Haryana
Indian castes
Social groups of Uttar Pradesh
Social groups of Rajasthan